Radelgar was the eldest son of Radelchis I of Benevento and he succeeded him as Prince of Benevento on his death in 851. Radelgar's mother was Caretrude and his brother was Adelchis.

He was succeeded as prince by his brother, because his son, Guaifer, was too young. He also had a daughter who married Lando III of Capua.

854 deaths
Princes of Benevento
9th-century rulers in Europe
9th-century Lombard people
Year of birth unknown